Yang Fulin (born October 1957) is a former Chinese military officer and politician who served as deputy commander of Xinjiang Production and Construction Corps from 2015 to 2017. He was investigated by China's top anti-graft agency in July 2021.

Biography
Yang was born in Wudu County (now Wudu District of Longnan), Gansu, in October 1957. He enlisted in the People's Liberation Army in August 1976, and joined the Chinese Communist Party (CCP) in November 1982. He assumed various posts in the 8th Division of Xinjiang Production and Construction Corps between 1976 and 2001. From 2001 to 2013, he successively worked in the 6th Division, 14th Division, and 3rd Division. In July 2013, he became secretary of the Political and Legal Affairs Commission of Xinjiang Production and Construction Corps, and held that office until April 2015, when he was commissioned as deputy commander of Xinjiang Production and Construction Corps.

Downfall
On 29 July 2021, he was put under investigation for alleged "serious violations of discipline and laws" by the Central Commission for Discipline Inspection (CCDI), the party's internal disciplinary body, and the National Supervisory Commission, the highest anti-corruption agency of China. His superior Liu Xinqi was under investigation for alleged "serious violations of discipline" in May 2017 and downgraded to division director level of non leadership positions. On December 1, he was expelled from the Communist Party. 

On 13 March 2022, he was indicted on suspicion of accepting bribes.

References

1957 births
Living people
People from Longnan
Northwest Normal University alumni
Central Party School of the Chinese Communist Party alumni
People's Republic of China politicians from Gansu
Chinese Communist Party politicians from Gansu